The 2020 San Jose State Spartans football team represented San José State University during the 2020 NCAA Division I FBS football season. The Spartans were led by fourth-year head coach Brent Brennan and played their home games at CEFCU Stadium and Sam Boyd Stadium as members of the Mountain West Conference. They finished the regular season 6–0 in Mountain West play and defeated Boise State in the Mountain West championship game. This was the Spartans' first Mountain West championship win and 17th overall conference title. The championship victory also marked San Jose State's first win over Boise State in program history.

Previous season
 
The Spartans finished the 2019 season 5–7, 2–6 in Mountain West play to finish in a three-way tie for fourth place in the West Division.

Schedule
San Jose State had non-conference games scheduled against Central Michigan, UC Davis, Penn State and UConn, but all of these games were canceled due to the COVID-19 pandemic. On August 10, 2020, the Mountain West Conference suspended all fall sports competitions due to the COVID-19 pandemic. However, MWC officials announced on Sept. 24 the conference would host a shortened fall football schedule.

The Oct. 31 game originally scheduled at University Stadium in Albuquerque was relocated to San Jose due to COVID-19 cases related to contact tracing in Bernalillo County, New Mexico.

On November 19, the game at Fresno State scheduled for Nov. 21 was canceled because of a positive COVID-19 test and contact tracing within the Fresno State program.

Nearly four and a half hours before kickoff, the Nov. 28 game at Boise State was canceled because of "an upward trend of COVID-19 cases and contact tracing within the Boise State football program."

The home game against Hawaii scheduled for Dec. 5 was moved to Aloha Stadium in Honolulu after new COVID-19 restrictions were released in Santa Clara County, where CEFCU Stadium is located.

The Dec. 11 home game against Nevada, originally scheduled to be played at CEFCU Stadium, was moved to Sam Boyd Stadium due to COVID-19 restrictions imposed by Santa Clara County.

The Mountain West conference championship game was to be hosted by San Jose at CEFCU Stadium, but was moved to Sam Boyd Stadium due to COVID-19 restrictions imposed by Santa Clara County.

Game summaries

Air Force

New Mexico

at San Diego State

UNLV

at Fresno State (No contest)

at Boise State (No contest)

at Hawaii

vs. Nevada

vs. Boise State (MWC Championship Game)

vs. Ball State (Arizona Bowl)

Rankings

On November 8, San Jose State received votes in the Coaches Poll for the first time since Week 2 of 2013. Then on November 15, San Jose State received votes in the AP Poll for the first time since being ranked no. 21 in the final 2012 season poll. This led to the Spartans cracking the College Football Playoff Top 25 for the first time, ranking no. 24 on Dec. 15, 2020.

Depth chart

Awards and honors

Individual Honors
Mountain West Conference Coach of the Year
Brent Brennan

Mountain West Conference Defensive Player of the Year
Cade Hall, DL

All-American Selections
Cade Hall, DL (TSN, USAT)

All-Mountain West Conference Team Selections

Ref:

References

San Jose State
San Jose State Spartans football seasons
Mountain West Conference football champion seasons
San Jose State Spartans football